Jan Quarless (born c. 1951) is a former American football player and coach.  He served as the Head Football Coach at Eastern Michigan University in 1992 and at Southern Illinois University Carbondale from 1997 to 2000, compiling a career college football record of 15–36. He was selected to the Northern Michigan University and Upper Michigan Hall of  Fame. Quarless holds a Master’s Degree from the University of Michigan and  PhD from Southern Illinois University.

Playing career
Quarless was a four-year lettermen for Northern Michigan University in Marquette, Michigan from 1969 to 1972 seasons and was team captain his senior year.

Coaching career

Eastern Michigan
Quarless became interim head football coach at Eastern Michigan University when Jim Harkema resigned after the first four games of the 1992 season.  Quarless's team produced a record of 1–6.  The lone victory was a 7–6 home game against Ohio.

Southern Illinois
Quarless was the 19th head football coach at the Southern Illinois University Carbondale, serving for four seasons, from 1997 to 2000, and compiling a record of 14–30.

Assistant coaching
Quarless had several tenures as an assistant coach for at several colleges, including Eastern Michigan, Bowling Green State University, the University of Kansas, and Wake Forest University.

Head coaching record

References

1950s births
Living people
Bowling Green Falcons football coaches
Eastern Michigan Eagles football coaches
Kansas Jayhawks football coaches
New Mexico Lobos football coaches
Northern Michigan Wildcats football players
Northwestern Wildcats football coaches
Rhein Fire coaches
Southern Illinois Salukis football coaches
Wake Forest Demon Deacons football coaches